Derek Paul Jack Boyle is a visual artist whose work frequently involves the anthropomorphism of everyday objects and absurdist interventions.

Boyle's work has been featured in The New York Times , VICE Creators Project, Elephant magazine, WYNC/NPR's Radiolab, and exhibited at Reed College RAW Festival and Brown University Pixilerations Festival. Boyle received his undergraduate degree from Emerson College in Boston and his MFA in Digital + Media from the Rhode Island School of Design. Boyle lives and works in Los Angeles and is one half of Meatwreck, a photographic and video collaboration with artist Mitra Saboury.

References

External links
 http://www.derekpauljackboyle.com
 http://www.instagram.com/meatwreck
 http://www.dazeddigital.com/photography/article/31764/1/gross-out-in-the-warped-world-of-photography-duo-meatwreck
 https://creators.vice.com/en_uk/article/meatwreck-absurd-photography-compositions

American photographers
Emerson College alumni
Rhode Island School of Design alumni
Living people
Year of birth missing (living people)